Tauriphila is a genus of dragonflies in the family Libellulidae. They are commonly known as Pasture Gliders. The species are neotropical with two, the Garnet and Aztec Gliders reaching the southern USA.

Species
The genus contains the following species:
Tauriphila argo  - Arch-tipped Glider

References

Libellulidae
Anisoptera genera
Taxa named by William Forsell Kirby